Paoletti is an Italian surname. Notable people with the surname include:

Antonio Ermolao Paoletti (1834–1912), Italian painter
Arturo Paoletti, Italian boxer
Christian Paoletti (born 1984), Italian footballer
Enzo Paoletti, Italian scientist
Gabriele Paoletti (born 1978), Italian footballer
Luigi Paoletti Vinea, 19th-century Italian painter
Marta Paoletti (born 1981), Italian ice dancer
Pietro Paolétti (1801–1847), Italian painter and engraver
Roland Paoletti (1931–2013), British-Italian architect

Italian-language surnames
Patronymic surnames
Surnames from given names